During the 1960–61 season Juventus Football Club competed in Serie A, the Coppa  Italia and the European Cup.

Summary
Juventus clinched the domestic title for the second year in a row.

Squad 

 (Captain)

Competitions

Serie A

League table

Matches

Coppa Italia

Eightfinals

Quarterfinals

Semifinals

3rd place

European Cup

Round of 32

Statistics

Goalscorers
 

28 goals
  Omar Sívori

16 goals
 John Charles
 Bruno Nicolè

13 goals
 Bruno Mora

6 goals
 Giampiero Boniperti

2 goals
 Sergio Cervato
 Gino Stacchini

1 goal
 Dario Cavallito
 Umberto Colombo
 Flavio Emoli
 Severino Lojodice

References

 
 
 
 l'Unità, 1966 and 1967.
 La Stampa, 1966 and 1967.

External links 
 http://www.calcio.com/tutte_le_partite/ita-serie-a-1960-1961/

Juventus F.C. seasons
Juventus
Italian football championship-winning seasons